The Journey may refer to:

Film and television 
 The Journey (1942 film), or El viaje, an Argentine film
 The Journey (1959 film), an American drama starring Deborah Kerr, Yul Brynner, and Jason Robards about the Hungarian Revolution of 1956
 The Journey (1986 film) (German: Die Reise), a Swiss-German drama by Markus Imhoof
 The Journey (1995 film) or Safar, an Iranian film directed by Ali-Reza Raisian
 The Journey (1992 film) or El viaje, an Argentine film
 The Journey (1997 film), a US film by Indian director Harish Saluja
 The Journey (2004 film) (Sancharam), an Indian Malayalam film by Ligy J. Pulleppally
 The Journey, a 2011 short film directed by Tharun Bhascker Dhaassyam
 The Journey (2014 Malaysian film) , a Malaysian film directed by Chiu Keng Guan
 The Journey (2014 Greek film), a Greek film of 2014
 The Journey (2016 film), a British-Irish drama film
 The Journey (2017 film), an Iraqi drama film
 The Journey (2021 film), a Japanese-Saudi Arabian animated film
 "The Journey" (Gargoyles), an episode of Gargoyles
 "The Journey" (The O.C.), an episode of The O.C.
 The Journey (TV series), a Singaporean periodical television series spanning three seasons from 2013 to 2015
 The Journey: A Voyage, 2013 season
 The Journey: Tumultuous Times, 2014 season
 The Journey: Our Homeland, 2015 season
 "The Journey" (Voltron: Legendary Defender), a 2017 third season episode

Literature and art 
 The Journey (Animorphs), a 2000 novel in the Animorphs series by K. A. Applegate
 Guardians of Ga'Hoole: The Journey, a 2003 novel by Kathryn Lasky
 A Journey, initially titled The Journey, a memoir by Tony Blair
 The Journey (Smith novel), a 1943 novel by Robert Paul Smith
 The Journey (installation), an art installation on the subject of human trafficking in the sex trade
The Journey (Steve Smith Book), autobiography of Australian cricketer Steve Smith
 "The Journey" ("Jatra"), a short story by Mamoni Raisom Goswami
 The Journey, a volume of the comics series Age of Reptiles by Ricardo Delgado
 The Journey, a 1990 novel by Ida Fink about Jewish sisters in hiding during the Holocaust
 The Journey, a 1999 guide by Brandon Bays about self-healing soul and body and experiencing freedom

Music

Albums 
 The Journey (911 album), or the title song (see below), 1997
 The Journey (Big Country album), 2013
 The Journey (Earl Klugh album), 1997
 The Journey (Immature album), 1997
 The Journey (Jamie Lynn Spears EP), 2014
 The Journey (Jessica Mauboy album), 2006
 The Journey (Khallice album), 2003
 The Journey (Ky-Mani Marley album), 2000
 The Journey (The Oak Ridge Boys album), 2004
 The Journey (Sean Tizzle album), 2014
 The Journey (Tina Guo album), 2011
 The Journey (Tommy Emmanuel album), or the title song (see below), 1993
 The Journey (Vinny Burns album), 1999
 The Journey (Voice of the Seven Woods EP), 2006
 The Journey (Willie Mack album), 2009
 The Journey: The Very Best of Donna Summer, 2003
 The Journey (Livin' Hits), by Craig Morgan, 2013
 The Journey, by Abdullah Ibrahim, 1977
 The Journey, by Steeleye Span, 1999

Extended plays 
 The Journey YYC, Vol. 1 by Paul Brandt, 2018
 The Journey BNA, Vol. 2 by Paul Brandt, 2018

Songs 
 "The Journey" (911 song), 1997
 "The Journey" (Tommy Emmanuel song), 1993
 "The Journey", a classical song by composer John Ireland
 "The Journey", by Boston from Don't Look Back
 "The Journey", by Dolores O'Riordan from No Baggage
 "The Journey", by Fatboy Slim from album Palookaville
 "The Journey", by Godsmack from Awake
 "The Journey", by Joe Satriani from Strange Beautiful Music
 "The Journey", by Lea Salonga from Lea Salonga
 "The Journey", by Paul Brandt from the extended play The Journey YYC, Vol. 1
 "The Journey", by Rick Wakeman from Journey to the Centre of the Earth
 "The Journey", by Shelby Flint from the 1977 film The Rescuers

Other 
 The Journey (DVD), a 2004 video by Battlelore
 The Journey (opera), a 1981 opera by John Metcalf
 The Journey, a Cree-language opera with a libretto by Tomson Highway

Video games 
 The Journey, a single player campaign mode in the video game FIFA 17

See also 
 Journey (disambiguation)
 Sancharam (disambiguation)